The 2017–18 Florida Gators men's basketball team represented the University of Florida in the 2017–18 NCAA Division I men's basketball season. The Gators were led by third year head coach Mike White and played their home games in the Exactech Arena at the Stephen C. O'Connell Center on the university's Gainesville, Florida campus as members of the Southeastern Conference. They finished the season 21–13, 11–7 in SEC play to finish in third place. They lost in the quarterfinals of the SEC tournament to Arkansas. They received an at-large bid to the NCAA tournament where they defeated St. Bonaventure in the First Round before losing in the Second Round to Texas Tech.

Previous season
The Gators finished the 2016–17 season 27–9, 14–4 in SEC play to finish in second place. They lost in the quarterfinals of the SEC tournament in overtime to 7-seed Vanderbilt. They received an at-large bid to the NCAA tournament as the East Region's No. 4 seed. They defeated 13-seed East Tennessee State and 5-seed Virginia to advance to the Sweet Sixteen. In the Sweet Sixteen, they defeated 8-seed Wisconsin with a three-pointer at the buzzer in overtime to earn a trip to the Elite Eight. In the Elite Eight, they lost to fellow SEC member 7-seed South Carolina.

Offseason

Departures

Incoming transfers

2017 recruiting class

Roster

Schedule and results

|-
!colspan=12 style=|Exhibition

|-
!colspan=12 style=| Regular season

|-
!colspan=12 style=| SEC Tournament

|-
!colspan=12 style=| NCAA tournament

Source

Rankings

*AP does not release post-NCAA tournament rankings

See also
 2017–18 Florida Gators women's basketball team

References

Florida Gators men's basketball seasons
Florida
Florida